Late Night Tales: The Cinematic Orchestra is a mix album compiled by British nu-jazz and electronic outfit the Cinematic Orchestra. It was released on 14 April 2010 as part of the Late Night Tales series. The mix includes tracks from artists such as Flying Lotus, Thom Yorke, Steve Reich, St Germain and Burial. It also features an exclusive studio version of their cover of Fontella Bass' song "Talking about Freedom".

Track listing

Personnel 
Mastering Engineer: Allen Farmelo

References

External links
 Official website
 Official Late Night Tales: The Cinematic Orchestra page

2010 compilation albums
Cinematic Orchestra
The Cinematic Orchestra albums